Veľké Slemence is a village and municipality in Michalovce District in the Košice Region of southeastern Slovakia.

History

In historical records the village was first mentioned in 1332. It was a single village named Szelmenc (between 1919 and 1938 it was called Slemence) before 1945. From 1919 until 1945, Szelmenc bore the same history as Subcarpathian Rus'. It was first ceded to Czechoslovakia in 1919, then after the First Vienna Award in 1938 it returned to the Kingdom of Hungary, then back, then, after the Soviet-Czechoslovak Treaty in 1945 was partially ceded to the Soviet Union along with Subcarpathian Rus'. The new border between the two states ran through Szelmenc. The town was divided between Slovakia (2/3) and Ukraine (1/3) by cutting it into two parts - Veľké Slemence became a part of Slovakia and Mali Selmentsi (Малі Селменці) a part of Ukraine.

In 1946, a house which lay exactly on the border was demolished with all the other objects in the way, and a 6 meter high palisade wall with watch towers and border patrolling were installed. For the next 60 years crossing between the two parts was prohibited. To meet with relatives on the other side, locals had to first travel 13 km to Uzhgorod for visas to Czechoslovakia. If their visa application, which took at least two weeks, was successful, they would travel 80 km south to the nearest border crossing, then 80 km back, and return the same way. Previously 3–500 meters and a half day, the trip became at least 160–200 km long for one way only and took at least a month to organize. Those, who tried to shout over from one side to the other were penalized on both parts. This resulted in discussing, sending messages, news in form of songs, sung loud near the border.

In 2003, a Székely gate (székelykapu) was installed on the border, one half of it being in the Slovak, while the other half being on the Ukrainian part of the border, with a short poem on the Mali Selmentsi part. The poem can be roughly translated as "From one Szelmenc became two, should be unified by the Creator, God bless with peace and keep us together, our hope remains, and will join together what torn apart, gate wings of the two Szelmec closes our villages together".

After the fall of communism, and more than a decade of fights with bureaucracy and negligence, a border checkpoint for pedestrians and cyclists was established in 2005 on the street which was divided. It was opened on 23 December 2005, ending 61 years of division. On 1 January 2008, Slovakia joined the Schengen Agreement, resulting in tightening of the crossing between the two Szelmences once again. The residents of Mali Selmentsi were again forced to travel to Uzhgorod to apply at the Slovak Consular Office for a visa to enter Slovakia and the Schengen Area. On the other hand, as Slovak citizens, the residents of Veľké Slemence could enter Mali Selmentsi and Ukraine without a visa. However, on 11 June 2017, the visa policy of the Schengen Area was amended. Ukrainian citizens holding biometric passports no longer require a visa to enter the Schengen Area for up to 90 days in a 180-day period. At present, the border between the two Szelmences can only be crossed by pedestrians and cyclists who are EU, EEA, Swiss and Ukrainian citizens.

The two parts have a total population of about 840 people, almost exclusively (+95%) ethnic Hungarians, with a few Romani in and around the village(s).

The elderly citizens of the two Szelmences were once citizens of Austria-Hungary, Czechoslovakia, the Kingdom of Hungary, and the Soviet Union, and now are the citizens of Slovakia (and thus the European Union) and Ukraine, while most of them have never left the village, where they were born.

Geography

The village lies at an altitude of 106 metres and covers an area of 9.972 km2. The municipality has a population of about 600 inhabitants.

Culture

The village has a football pitch.

Education

Dobó István Hungarian Elementary School

Bibliography
Zelei, Miklós: A kettézárt falu. Ister Kiadó, Budapest, 2000.

Gallery

References

Egy határátkelés tapasztalatai, Találjuk ki Közép-Euópát?, September 19, 2007 (Hungarian)
Schengenjárás Szelmencen, September 7, 2007 (Hungarian)
Pic of the old border on Flickr
A videoreport in English, made by the American Hungarian Federation, americanhungarianfederation.org, 2004 (English)
News From Szelmenc, americanhungarianfederation.org (English only)
Vasfüggöny után újabb vasfüggöny, Új Szó online, November 7, 2003 (Hungarian)

External links

Villages and municipalities in Michalovce District
Divided cities
Slovakia–Ukraine border crossings
Hungarian communities in Slovakia